Hasan Ali Durtuluk (born January 1, 1989) is a Turkish football midfielder who plays for Derincespor.

External links
 Guardian Stats Centre
 

1989 births
Living people
People from Bozkır
Turkish footballers
Turkey youth international footballers
İstanbul Başakşehir F.K. players
Manisaspor footballers
Süper Lig players
Association football midfielders